Gladys de la Lastra (Penonomé, 6 March 1932 – Panama City, 28 September 2005) was a drummer, composer and musician from Panama.

Biography 
De la Lastra was born on 6 March 1932 in Penonomé. She studied at the Simeón Conte School and then studied at the National Institute of Panama for her secondary schooling. She went on to study at the National Institute of Music. After graduating she de la Lastra taught music at the State of Israel and Old Panama School.

De la Lastra's first composition was "La Princesa del Zaratí", which was composed in a bolero-style for the centenary of Coclé, when she was aged 17. This song highlighted national values. De la Lastra believed that her musical ability was a gift from god. Religious and nationalist themes were found throughout her work and she was a member of the Trade Union of Art Workers of Panama (SITAP).

De la Lastra died on 28 September 2005 and was hailed as a national hero. Her coffin was pulled by white horses through the streets of Penonomé, which were lined with people.

Music 

De la Lastra is famous for her guitar-playing and drumming. She wrote many songs throughout a long career, some of which include:

 Romance Salinero 
 If the Treaty  
 Bolívar American Hero  
 Portobelo  
 Already Enter the Canal Zone 
 Summer Dreams 
 Sovereignty  
 Chiriquí Grande 
 My Penonomé  
 Cristiano the Church is You 
 A Santa Ana  
 Victoriano Lorenzo  
 El Proyecto del Bayano 
 Ingenio La Victoria 
 La Guerra del Banano 
 Panama Chiquita (one of the last pieces she composed)

De la Lastra composed over 200 songs during her career, as well as  anthems for the University of Panama and for the Centenary of the Republic of Panama.

Awards 
1949 – Medal of Honour awarded by the Municipal Council of Penonomé

1960 – Cocle's Favourite Daughter

1961 – Anayansi Award for Publicity Interamericana for the composition Panama Soberana

1981 – Commander of the Order Belisario Porras

1981 –  First Prize at the Festival of the Mediterranean and Latin American Tourist Song, held in Estoril (Portugal), the 'Golden Caravel' trophy for the song The Drummer I Have

1996 – Intellectual Woman of the Year selected by the Circle of Intellectual Women of Panama (CIMIP)

2005 – Order Vasco Núñez de Balboa

Legacy 
The Gladys de la Lastra Festival has been held annually since 2013 in Penonomé and is dedicated to the work of the singer. After he death the mayor Agustín Méndez, hoped to erect a statue and name a street after her. Every 3 November, schools across Panama sing her song La Angoustoura.

de la Lastra in the Media 

De la Lastra "Megamix"
Funeral of Gladys de la Lastra
'Gladys de la Lastra'

References 

Panamanian women
Panamanian musicians
Panamanian nationalists
1932 births
2005 deaths